The Golden Monkey Stamp or Gēngshēn Monkey is a postage stamp issued in China in 1980 of which 5 million copies were printed. Although not rare, the stamp has come to symbolise the strong market for collectable postage stamps in Asia. Demand for the stamp has made it one of the most sought after contemporary Chinese stamps.

Technical details 
The stamp was designed by Huang Yongyu and Shao Bolin and printed by the photogravure and recess printing methods. It is perforated 11.5.

Chinese New Year stamps 
The stamp is in the popular Chinese zodiac series for the Chinese new year, the most recent of which is the 2011 Year of the Rabbit stamp which sold out at post offices in China within a few hours. In Chinese culture the number 8 and the colour red are both seen as lucky.

Philatelic value 
Although the stamp was initially common, a full sheet of 80 sold for 1.2 million yuan ($180,000 or £117,200) in 2011 with a single stamp selling for 10,000 yuan ($1,500), which was 125,000 times more than its original price of 8 fen. The stamp had a catalogue value of US$10 unused and US$5 used in 1988. In August 2011, a complete sheet sold for HK$1.44M (£117,300) in Zurich Asia's Hong Kong sale, and another sheet sold for HK$1.495,000 (£122,700) at an InterAsia sale in September 2011.

Forgeries
The stamp has become so valuable that it has been repeatedly forged.

See also
Asian philately
 China Philatelic Society of London
 China Stamp Society
Postage stamps and postal history of the People's Republic of China

References

Postage stamps of China
1980 in China
1980 works
Monkeys